Jozef Hrdlička (born 29 July 1977) is a Slovak politician and leader of the Communist Party of Slovakia (KSS). He was elected as a Member of the National Council in the 2002 parliamentary election, remaining in parliament until 2006.

References

1977 births
Living people
Slovak communists
Members of the National Council (Slovakia) 2002-2006
Communist Party of Slovakia politicians